The Game Theater XP (aka GTXP) is a sound card which was developed and manufactured by Hercules. It was first available in the United States in 2001. As of July 2006, it is no longer available on their website. Over the years the GTXP has picked up somewhat of a cult following from computer audiophiles all over the world

See also 
 Sound card
 Sensaura (owned by Creative Technology)
 Creative Technology
 Hercules Computer Technology

References

External links
 
 
 

Sound cards